Daejeon-myeon is an administrative unit of Damyang-gun, Jeollanam-do. This is located in southern part of South Korea.

External links
 Daejeon-myeon, Damyang-gun webpage 

Damyang County